Koleh Jub-e Sofla or Kolah Jub-e Sofla may refer to:

 Kolah Jub-e Sofla, Kermanshah
 Koleh Jub-e Sofla, Lorestan
 Kalleh Jub, Zagheh